Dol Prasad Aryal is a Nepalese politician, who served as the Minister for Labour, Employment and Social Security for a term of 20 days in the Prachanda-led government. He is a member of the Pratinidhi Sabha, having been elected as a proportional representative from the Khas people category in the 2022 Nepalese general election.

He briefly served as the acting chairman of Rastriya Swatantra Party in January 2023 when Rabi Lamichhane was stripped of all his positions after his citizenship was declared invalid by the Supreme Court. Lamichhane succeeded him two days later after re-acquiring Nepali citizenship.

References

Living people
Nepal MPs 2022–present
Year of birth missing (living people)
Rastriya Swatantra Party politicians